James Andrew Innes Dee (born 24 September 1961), known professionally as Jack Dee, is an English stand-up comedian, actor, presenter and writer known for his sarcasm, irony and deadpan humour. He wrote and starred in the sitcom Lead Balloon and hosts the panel show I'm Sorry I Haven't A Clue.

His UK television appearances include being a team captain on Shooting Stars and hosting Jack Dee: Live at the Apollo, which was nominated for a BAFTA in 2006. He also presented The Jack Dee Show, Jack Dee's Saturday Night and Jack Dee's Happy Hour. He won Celebrity Big Brother 1 in 2001.

Early life and education
Jack Dee was the youngest of three children born to Rosemary ( Stamper) and Geoffrey Dee, after Joanna Innes Dee and David Simon Innes Dee. He was born in the Municipal Borough of Bromley, Kent (now within the London Borough of Bromley) and grew up in Petts Wood before moving with his family to Winchester when he was young. His father was a printer and his mother was the daughter of two repertory actors, Henry Lionel Pope Stamper (1906–1985) and Edna May Howard Innes (1904–1969).

Dee was educated at both private and state schools. His first school, The Pilgrims' School, a preparatory school in Winchester, was followed by the state Montgomery of Alamein School for his secondary education, and for a period he attended Frensham Heights School. He took his A-levels at Peter Symonds' College, and left with a D and an F grade. Following this, he planned to attend drama college, but his plans were scuppered when his mother persuaded him to get a vocation, and so he entered the catering industry and became a waiter.

Career

Dee's first public act was an open-mic gig in 1986 at The Comedy Store, which he went to one evening after work. He was encouraged to write additional material and to tour the circuit.

Since the 1990s, he has performed sell-out acts at many high-profile venues (including the London Palladium and the Hammersmith Apollo). After he scooped the British Comedy Award for Best Stage Newcomer in 1991, Dee was offered his own show; The Jack Dee Show first went out on Channel 4 in February 1992, bringing him to a wider audience. His combination of stand-up routines on television continued with Jack Dee's Saturday Night on ITV, Jack Dee's Happy Hour in 1997 and later Jack Dee Live at the Apollo in 2004 on BBC One.

In 1996, he starred alongside Jeremy Hardy in Jack and Jeremy's Real Lives, a collection of mockumentaries similar to their previous collaboration, Jack and Jeremy's Police 4. Each episode would focus on the pair playing bizarre characters from a particular profession. Shot on film and featuring no laugh track, the show failed to catch on. After three episodes, it was moved to air after midnight. The pilot featured Sacha Baron Cohen being electrocuted. Aside from his successful stand-up career, Dee has played starring roles and guest appearances in television series. He played the part of Doug Digby in the Grimleys pilot (1997) before the role was recast for the series, and made guest appearances on such programmes as Silent Witness, Dalziel and Pascoe and Jonathan Creek.

In 2001, he won Celebrity Big Brother (then linked to fundraising for Comic Relief). During evictions, he dressed up in a tweed jacket and cap and held his packed suitcase, hoping to be voted out. During the eviction of another housemate he briefly absconded to sneak a quick kiss with his wife. He also escaped for several hours at night-time. He has subsequently said that he dislikes the treatment of the housemates by the show and its producers, and has refused all permission for any of the clips to be shown again.

In 2004, he played the role of Steven Sharples MP the self-styled 'Deputy Home Secretary' alongside Warren Clarke and Dervla Kirwan in The Deputy. Dee's performance was praised, though the film itself received a lukewarm response. Later that year he starred in another one-off drama, Tunnel of Love. He was the celebrity advocate in Britain's Best Sitcom for Fawlty Towers and presented an hour-long documentary about the series.

In 2005, he co-hosted Comic Aid, a one-off gathering of comedians that aimed to raise money for the Asian Tsunami Appeal. In May of the same year he appeared on the "Star in a Reasonably-Priced Car" segment of the BBC Two series Top Gear, achieving a lap time of 1:53.5 (52nd on the Suzuki Liana leader board). His series Lead Balloon, which he also co-wrote, began on BBC Four on 4 October 2006. Described as "Britain's answer to Curb Your Enthusiasm", Lead Balloon sees Dee play the semi-biographical role of Rick Spleen. A second series of eight episodes was commissioned and was broadcast on BBC Two in 2007, with a third series debuting on Thursday 13 November 2008. A fourth series finished on the BBC on 5 July 2011. He also starred as Harry in the 2005 film Short Order.

In February 2009, it was announced that Dee would be one of a trio of hosts to replace the late Humphrey Lyttelton for the summer series of I'm Sorry I Haven't a Clue (the others being Stephen Fry and Rob Brydon). He subsequently became the permanent host from the 52nd series onwards. He is also a frequent guest on QI and Have I Got News for You, which he has guest-presented ten times, and he hosts segments of the BBC's biennial Comic Relief telethon. He starred in advertisements for John Smith's Bitter in the 1990s, becoming known as "the midget with the widget". He made his stage debut in 1998, playing Yvan in Yasmina Reza's Olivier award-winning 'Art'. He later returned as Serge for a 13-week run at the request of the director.

In 2008, Dee took part in the 15th anniversary special of Shooting Stars where he replaced Will Self as captain of Team A. The show aired on 30 December 2008 on BBC2. Dee returned as team captain in series 6 of Shooting Stars on 26 August 2009, and again for the 7th series. Over Christmas 2009, Dee played the role of John Tweedledum in The News at Bedtime.

In 2010, Dee took part in Channel 4's Comedy Gala, a benefit show held in aid of Great Ormond Street Children's Hospital, filmed live at the O2 Arena in London on 30 March. In 2013, Dee joined Dara Ó Briain, Chelsee Healey, Greg James, Melanie C and Philips Idowu in Through Hell and High Water, a Comic Relief challenge which involved British celebrities canoeing the most difficult rapids of the Zambezi River. They raised more than £1 million for the charity.

In 2017, Dee co-wrote and starred in Bad Move, a sitcom about a middle-aged man and his wife (played by Kerry Godliman) who move from the city to a country cottage in search of the rural dream, which becomes more of a nightmare. A second series was broadcast in 2018.

Personal life
Dee met Susan Jane Hetherington in 1986, when he was working as a waiter in Fulham and she was a receptionist at a nearby hotel. They married in Winchester, Hampshire, in 1989. The couple divide their time between a family home in Wandsworth, London and a holiday house near Chichester, West Sussex. Together, they have four children.

Dee suffers from depression, and he has claimed that his work is the best therapy for his condition, saying "if you have the impulse to be creative, you ignore it at your peril".

In his twenties, Dee worked at the Ritz in Central London and started drinking heavily. He attended church and attempted to become a priest. After he realised that was not for him he gave it up, and never quit drinking, although he would later describe his condition as "alcohol abuse" rather than alcoholism, which was the diagnosis at the time. Since the 1990s, he has advertised John Smith's Bitter, becoming known as "the midget with the widget".
Following his appearance on Celebrity Big Brother, he had a relapse, though did not attend AA meetings because he did not want paparazzi photographing him leaving the meetings.

In 2007, the Daily Express reported that he was in negotiations with publishers to release his autobiography. He signed with Doubleday in 2008 and the book, Thanks for Nothing: The Jack Dee Memoirs, was released in October 2009, along with an audiobook of the same title which he narrates. According to Dee, "it's really the story of how I got into comedy... It's kind of an autobiography but isn't, as it stops about 25 years ago. It goes right up to the first time I do stand up."

In February 2009, Dee and several other entertainers wrote an open letter to The Times supporting Baháʼí leaders, then on trial in Iran.

Dee is a director of Open Mike Productions, co-founded with Addison Cresswell, which produces shows for television and radio including Michael McIntyre's Comedy Roadshow and Alan Carr: Chatty Man.

Filmography

Awards and nominations

Books
 Thanks for Nothing (Doubleday, 2009) 
 What is Your Problem? (Quercus, 2021)

Stand-up VHS & DVDs
Live at the Duke of York's Theatre  (1992)
Live at the London Palladium (10 October 1994)
Live in London (10 November 1997)
Live and Uncut (13 December 1999) [extended version of Live in London]
Live at the Apollo (18 November 2002)
Live Again (14 November 2005)
So What? Live (18 November 2013)

References

External links
Jack Dee at Off the Kerb Productions

 Guide to Comedy
Jack Dee at the British Film Institute

1961 births
Living people
Big Brother (British TV series) winners
English male comedians
English stand-up comedians
English male television actors
People educated at Peter Symonds College
People from Petts Wood
Actors from Winchester
Male actors from Hampshire
People educated at Frensham Heights School
Mass media people from Winchester
20th-century English male actors
21st-century English male actors
English television writers
English male writers
20th-century English comedians
21st-century English comedians
British male television writers